Epithelioid trophoblastic tumor (ETT) is a gestational trophoblastic disease with about 110 case reports in the literature. It is a trophoblastic tumor of neoplastic chorionic type associated with the intermediate trophoblast.

Signs and symptoms
 Vaginal bleeding: The most common presenting symptom is vaginal bleeding, which is associated with mild elevation of serum β hCG (< 2,500 IU/L)
 Amenorrhea.

Morphology

Gross appearance
 There is deep infiltration of the surrounding structures by cystic hemorrhagic masses or discrete nodules.
 Necrosis is present with white to tan-brown cut surface with hemorrhage.
 Ulceration (common finding)
 Fistula (common finding)

Microscopic appearance

 Nodular, well circumscribed, focal infiltrative at the periphery.
 Uniform, mononucleate tumor cells are arranged in nests and cords.
 Tumor nests are associated with eosinophilic, fibrillar, hyaline-like material.
 Extensive necrosis with irregular contours.
 Calcification (common finding)
 Metaplastic endocervical or endometrial surface epithelium into squamous-like epithelium.

Locations
Common locations are:
Uterus
Lower uterine segment (40%)
Cervix (31% of cases)
Lungs (19% of cases)

They may rarely develop in 
Vagina
Broad ligament
Fallopian tubes
Other pelvic organs

Diagnosis

Treatment
Epithelioid trophoblastic tumors (ETTs) are resistant to chemotherapy, but an immunotherapy drug called dostarlimab treats gestational trophoblastic neoplasia. ETT is a form of GTN.  Stage I disease is treated with hysterectomy, while metastatic disease is treated with surgery and chemotherapy.

Prognosis
Metastasis occur in 25% of cases and 10% die of the disease. Mitotic count of > 6/10HPF is an unfavorable prognostic factor.

References

Germ cell neoplasia
Rare diseases